Red Nose Day 2015 was a fund-raising event organised by Comic Relief, broadcast live on BBC One and BBC Two from the evening of 13 March 2015 to early the following morning. It was part of the "Face the Funny" campaign and was held on BBC One from Friday 13 March till Saturday 14 March 2015.

Following the closure of BBC Television Centre in 2013, Comic Relief has had to look for new locations to hold the annual telethons as they were previously filmed live from Studio One. Sport Relief 2014 was the first telethon not filmed at Television Centre but at the Copper Box in London's Olympic Park. As a result, Red Nose Day 2015 was broadcast live, for the first time in its history, from the heart of London in its most prestigious theatre, the London Palladium.

Results
After 30 years of Comic Relief, the overall total stands at £1,047,000,000.

Before main event

Documentaries

Operation Health
A team of celebrities supporting local residents will transform a run-down clinic in eastern Uganda into a fully functioning healthcare facility. The entire story of Comic Relief's brand-new, ambitious and life-changing project Operation Health is finally coming to TV screens across the country. Celebrities who took part included: Lenny Henry, Richard Hammond, Doon Mackichan, Anita Rani, John Bishop, Steve Backshall, and Dermot O'Leary.

Television and Radio

The Great Comic Relief Bake Off
The Bake Off returned for a four-part series on Wednesday 11 February at 8pm on BBC One. Mary Berry and Paul Hollywood returned as judges whilst Mel Giedroyc, Sue Perkins, Jo Brand and Ed Byrne each hosted one of the four episodes.

The episode line up was as follows:

 Star Baker

Jo Brand hosted a special edition of The Great British Bake Off: An Extra Slice on Friday 13 March at 10pm on BBC Two in which the four star bakers competed for the title of Ultimate Star Baker. Mary Berry crowned Victoria Wood as the winner.

Let's Play Darts for Comic Relief
Starting on Sunday 1 March 2015, Gabby Logan hosted a week-long darts competition that aired on BBC Two in which a group of celebrities teamed up with professional darts players and went head-to-head in a winner-take-all tournament. There were four quarter finals. After five rounds of darts the winner was announced. Then the semi-finals were held, followed by the two winning duos facing off in the final round.

The celebrity and professional partnerships were as follows:

The People's Strictly
Starting on Wednesday 25 February 2015, Tess Daly and Claudia Winkleman hosted the first ever Strictly Come Dancing that was open to members of the public. Airing on Wednesday nights at 9pm, the first two episodes showed the six nominated members of the public finding out they had won a place on the show, followed by their training in ballroom dancing. On Wednesday 11 March at 9pm, all six couples performed live, with the winner then being crowned on Red Nose Day Night, Friday 13 March 2015. The judging panel consists of Len Goodman, Bruno Tonioli, Darcey Bussell and Anton Du Beke. It was announced on Red Nose Day Night that Cassidy Little and Natalie Lowe had won the first 'The People's Strictly'.

The Graham Norton Show
On Friday 6 March at 10:35pm on BBC One, Graham Norton hosted a special Comic Relief edition of The Graham Norton Show to celebrate 30 years of Comic Relief. His guests were past and present contributors to Comic Relief: Jennifer Saunders, David Walliams, Cheryl Cole, Jack Dee and Johnny Vegas. During the programme they showed an exclusive clip of the Little Britain Skit with Stephen Hawking as well as an appeal film in which David Walliams was reunited with a boy called Phillip whom he met whilst filming an appeal film for Sport Relief 2012.

Other events and popular culture

Danceathon
The first Comic Relief Danceathon was held on Sunday 8 March, where the public strutted their stuff for six hours and helped change lives. A host of stars took part including Caroline Flack, Davina McCall, Rufus Hound and host Claudia Winkleman at The SSE Arena, Wembley.

Dermot's Day of Dance

Dermot O'Leary danced non-stop for 24 hours to raise money for Red Nose Day 2015. He began at 19:20 on 12 March 2015, live during The One Show and finished at 19:20 on Red Nose Day 2015 on 13 March 2015. Dermot danced outside The One Show Studio at broadcasting house in a designated area with a dance floor, screens and DJ mixers. During the night he also moved inside to the One Show Studio, where a temporary dance floor had been created.

During the challenge Dermot was only allowed breaks in order to go the toilet and to shower. During his challenge many famous faces came along to dance, support, perform and do a DJ set; these stars included: Ben Shephard, Lenny Henry, Alex Jones, Matt Baker, Rufus Hound, Davina McCall, Claudia Winkleman, Jo Whiley, Edith Bowman, Nick Grimshaw, Ronan Keating, Tony Blackburn, Lauren Laverne, Holly Willoughby, Jamie Oliver, Little Mix, Kirstie Allsopp, Carol Kirkwood, Clean Bandit, Michael Ball, Caroline Flack, Laura Whitmore, Ashley Roberts, Blue, Zoë Ball, Sophie Ellis-Bextor, Keith Lemon, Joey Essex, Fearne Cotton, Rastamouse, Twiggy, Bucks Fizz, Terry Wogan and Chris Evans. During the 24-hour dance-off, Dermot raised a total of £643,336.

Mark Watson's Comedy Marathon
From Friday 27 February until Saturday 28 February 2015, Mark Watson attempted to do stand-up comedy for 27 hours to raise money for Comic Relief. He completed his challenge late in the evening of 28 February 2015.

David Walliams book
David Walliams wrote a Children's Short Story for Comic Relief 2015 called The Queen's Orang-Utan selling at £4.99. All profits went to Comic Relief, as did all future sales of the book.

Phoenix Nights Live
Phoenix Nights returned for the first time in fifteen years with a set of very special live shows in aid of Comic Relief. Reuniting the full original cast, the show ran for fifteen nights at Manchester Arena.

The multi-award-winning and critically acclaimed series followed the rise and fall of scheming club impresario Brian Potter and his band of loyal staff and regulars who will do just about anything to make his beloved Phoenix club a success despite all the odds being stacked against them. Peter Kay said "Comic Relief has always been close to my heart and I always try to think of something. I could think of no better way to raise money and have fun than getting everybody back together."

The show began its run on Saturday 31 January and finished on Monday 16 February.

Paddy McGuinness stated on The Jonathan Ross Show on 20 February that the total raised by the show was approximately £5 million. This total was later confirmed on Red Nose Day Night as being £5,031,146.47.

British industry

Rimmel London
Supermodel Kate Moss created a new lipstick for Comic Relief 2015 and showed it off in a spoof advert featuring David Walliams dressing up as some of the world's most famous supermodels.

Sainsbury's
Sainsbury's sold Red Nose Day 2015 official merchandise in all of their stores across the UK, as they have for over the past 15 years. By doing this, a total of £11,521,278 was raised.

TK Maxx
It was revealed on Red Nose Day Night that the employees and customers of TK Maxx raised a total of £4,064,106.

Maltesers
The employees and customers of Maltesers raised a total of £1,334,842.

Main event
Orlando Bloom made a special appearance during the main show, kissing both Davina McCall and David Walliams. Barbara Windsor appeared later in the show, kissing Walliams in the Royal Box. Made in Chelsea's Jamie Lang also appeared on the show.

During the main event the UK Government announced that they would match the money raised by UK schools up to £10 million.

Walliams successfully attempted to break the world record for 'Most Kisses Received in 30 Seconds' and beat the minimum number of kisses required to earn the world record by 5, receiving 55 kisses.

Presenters

Appeal films

It was announced on 3 March 2015 that Olivia Colman, Idris Elba, Peter Capaldi, John Bishop, Dermot O'Leary and Lenny Henry would front the appeal films for the 2015 telethon.

Whilst filming his appeal films in Kenya, Dermot O'Leary was sleeping rough with three boys when a car swerved off the road and almost killed him and the three boys.

Sketches and features

Musical Performances

Cast

Adil Ray
Barbara Windsor
Ben Miller
Ben Whishaw
Catherine Tate
Cheryl Fernandez-Versini
Chuckle Brothers
Claudia Winkleman
Daniel Craig
David Gandy
David Walliams
Davina McCall
Dawn French
Dermot O'Leary
Doc Brown
Dustin Demri-Burns
Eddie Izzard
Ella Henderson
Emma Watson
Fiona Bruce
Frank Skinner
Gok Wan
Greg James
Idris Elba
Jack Dee
James Fleet
Jennifer Saunders
John Bishop
John Legend
Johnny Vegas
Jo Brand
Katie Price
Keith Harris
Labrinth
Lenny Henry
Liam Gallagher
Mark Watson
Mary Berry
Matt Berry
Maureen Lipman
Michael Sheen
Miranda Hart
Nick Helm
Olivia Colman
Orlando Bloom
Paddy McGuinness
Patrick Kielty
Peter Kay
Rebecca Front
Robbie Williams
Ronnie Corbett
Rowan Atkinson
Russell Brand
Ruth Jones
Sam Smith
Sarah Millican
Sebastian Cardinal
Sheridan Smith
Stephen Hawking
Stephen Fry
Tess Daly
Trevor Noah
Trevor Peacock
Vic Reeves
Victoria Wood

Donation progress

References

Red Nose Day
2015 in British television
2015 in the United Kingdom
March 2015 events in the United Kingdom